Horde may refer to:

History
 Orda (organization), a historic sociopolitical and military structure in steppe nomad cultures such as the Turks and Mongols
 Golden Horde, a Turkic-Mongol state established in the 1240s
 Wings of the Golden Horde, also known as White, Blue and Gray Hordes, formed in 1226 and 1227
 Great Horde, a remnant of the Golden Horde from about 1466 until 1502
 Nogai Horde, a Turkic clan situated in the Caucasus Mountain region, formed in the 1390s
 Eurasian nomads generally
 a historical term for band society, the simplest form of human society, in anthropology

Film and television
 The Horde (She-Ra), a group of fictional characters in She-Ra: Masters of the Universe and She-Ra: Princesses of Power media
 The Horde (2009 film), a French film
 The Horde (2012 film), a Russian historical film
 The Horde, 23 prominent personalities in the character Kevin Wendell Crumb in the 2016 American film Split
 The Horde, a fictional Aryan motorcycle gang in the television series The Shield

Music
 Horde (band), an unblack metal project of Australian musician Jayson Sherlock
 H.O.R.D.E., a music festival in the United States
 Horde (album), a 1981 album by Mnemonist Orchestra

Video games
 Horde, one of the factions in the Warcraft universe
 Locust Horde, the main enemies in the Xbox 360 video game Gears of War
 The Horde (video game), a 1994 action-strategy video game
 Horde: Northern wind, a 1999 real-time strategy video game
 Horde 2: The Citadel, a 2001 real-time strategy video game

Other uses
 Horde (software), a web application framework of various applications including an email client
 Great Dark Horde, a group within the Society for Creative Anachronism modeled on an idealized version of Mongol culture
 Horde (comics), several characters and a species used in Marvel Comics
 Hörde, a quarter of the city of Dortmund, Germany
 Human Olfactory Data Explorer (HORDE), a database of human olfactory receptors
 The Horde (boxed set), an accessory for the Advanced Dungeons & Dragons fantasy role-playing game
 Horde chess, a variant of Dunsany's chess

See also
 Hoard (disambiguation)
 Army
 Clan
 Nomadic pastoralism, a form of agriculture practiced by steppe nomads